Moya Brady (born 8 September 1962) is an English actress.  Her roles include Breda McQueen on the Channel 4 soap opera Hollyoaks from 2018 to 2020.

Brady grew up in the seaside town of Blackpool, Lancashire, England. She has appeared in a wide variety of roles in film, television and the theatre, including a role as F.D.O. Roberta Cryer in the police drama series, The Bill and Harry Hill's TV Burp. Brady's 2009 films include The Imaginarium of Doctor Parnassus and The Soloist. She appeared in the Doctor Who episode "Love & Monsters" as Bridget in 2006. In 2021, she played the role of Millie in Russell T Davies’ Channel 4 series It's a Sin.

Selected credits
Road (1987) as Clare
Little Dorrit (1988) as the Fiddler's Daughter 
Life Is Sweet (1990) as Paula
Making Out (1989–1991) as Klepto
Men Behaving Badly (1992) as Dorothy's friend
Wide-Eyed and Legless (1993) as Sheila
The NeverEnding Story III (1994) as Urgl
The Bill (1995) as Stacey McNab – Guest; 1 episode 
Mary Reilly (1996) as Young Woman
Peak Practice (2000) as Madeline Castle
Gimme Gimme Gimme (2000) as Maddie
The Emperor's New Clothes (2001) as Woman
The Bill (2002–2003) as Roberta Cryer – Series regular; 71 episodes
Shameless (2005) as Cassie Western
My Hero (2000) as Avril
Pride & Prejudice (2005) as Lambton Maid
Doctor Who (2006) episode: "Love & Monsters" as Bridget – Guest; 1 episode 
Mayo (2006) as Miriam Thorne
Scoop (2006) as Screamer
The Chase (2006) as Cindy
Casualty (2006) as Liz Criddick
Doctors (2000 and 2006) as Eileen Groves and Maggie Wolfe
M.I. High (2007) as the Guinea pig – Guest; 1 episode 
The Soloist (2009) as Barely Dressed Woman
The Imaginarium of Doctor Parnassus (2009) as Auntie Flo
Shameless (2013) as Remona
Josh (2016) episode: "Planks & Pranks" as Sophie's Mother
Hollyoaks (2018–2020) as Breda McQueen – Series regular; 161 episodes 
Hollyoaks Later (2020) as Breda McQueen – 2020 special
It’s A Sin (2021) as Millie

References

External links
 

1962 births
Living people
English television actresses
English soap opera actresses
Actresses from Manchester